Franciscan Friars established Mission Nuestra Señora de la Purísima Concepción de Acuña (also Mission Concepción) in 1711 as Nuestra Señora de la Purísima Concepción de los Hainais in East Texas. The friars moved the mission in 1731 to San Antonio. After its relocation most of the people in the mission were Pajalats who spoke a Coahuiltecan language. Catholic Mass is still held at the mission every Sunday.

On October 28, 1835, Mexican troops under Colonel Domingo de Ugartechea and Texian insurgents led by James Bowie and James Fannin fought the Battle of Concepción here. Historian J.R. Edmondson describes the 30-minute engagement as "the first major engagement of the Texas Revolution."

Mission Concepción  is the oldest unrestored stone church in America. it was designated a National Historic Landmark on April 15, 1970 and is part of San Antonio Missions National Historical Park. In 2015, the United Nations Educational, Scientific, and Cultural Organization designated Concepción and four other San Antonio missions, including The Alamo, as a World Heritage Site, the first in Texas and one of twenty-three such establishments in the United States.

Mission Concepción consists of a sanctuary, nave, convento, and granary. When originally built, brightly painted frescos decorated both the exterior and interior of the building. Traces of the frescoes still exist on the weathered facade of the building. Experts restored some of the artwork on the interior ceilings and walls of the convento in 1988. The Archdiocese of San Antonio completed another restoration of the mission's interior in 2010 which exposed more frescoes in the sanctuary and nave.

Gallery

Solar alignment
The western entrance to the church is aligned to the sunset in such a way that an "annual double solar illumination event" occurs every year on or around August 15, the feast day of the Assumption of Mary.

See also

Spanish missions in Texas
Mission San José y San Miguel de Aguayo
Mission San Juan Capistrano
Mission San Francisco de la Espada
Espada Acequia

References

External links

San Antonio Missions National Historical Park
Mission Conception parish
Mission Conception entry at Handbook of Texas Online

Concepcion
San Antonio Missions National Historical Park
San Antonio Missions (World Heritage Site)
Buildings and structures in San Antonio
Roman Catholic churches completed in the 1730s
History of San Antonio
National Register of Historic Places in San Antonio
Properties of religious function on the National Register of Historic Places in Texas
Historic American Buildings Survey in Texas
1716 establishments in Texas
1731 establishments in Texas
Spanish Colonial architecture in Texas
National Historic Landmarks in Texas
18th-century Roman Catholic church buildings in the United States